WQED Multimedia is an American nonprofit corporation based in Pittsburgh that owns and operates three public broadcasting stations:

 Television station WQED (TV) (VHF channel 13)
 Radio station WQED-FM (89.3 FM)
 Radio station WQEJ-FM (89.7 FM)

WQED-TV is a member station of PBS, and WQED-FM/WQEJ-AM are member stations of NPR. The company's headquarters and production facility is located at 4802 Fifth Avenue in Pittsburgh's Oakland neighborhood.

From 1970 to 2009, the company also owned and published Pittsburgh Magazine.

History 
WQED went on the air on April 1, 1954, as the first community-sponsored educational television station in the U.S.
 In 1959, WQEX-TV was launched for the purpose of classroom instructional content. The network provided specialized educational television starting in 1963, through WQEX. It was the first time that a station used management training and vocational education in Pittsburgh. Stations in South Carolina, Maine, Minnesota, Massachusetts, Virginia and the District of Columbia soon put these methods into practice
 In 1973, Classical WQED-FM 89.3 was launched, making it the region's only 24-hour classical music radio station.

WQED has partnered with local community organizations to improve arts, education, culture, community health, economics and local issues through civic journalism. WQED's mission is to create an educated and informed viewer.

Air content 
WQED's schedule includes seven locally-produced television programs that air Mondays-Saturday evenings:
 Experience
 Horizons
 It’s Pittsburgh and a lot of other stuff
 Pittsburgh 360
 4802
 Filmmakers Corner
 QED Cooks

WQED produces frequent specials that focus on local issues and topics, documentaries and town hall meetings. The Pittsburgh History Series which include a set of 30-plus documentaries about the southwest Pennsylvania region.

WQED now reaches southwestern Pennsylvania, eastern Ohio, northern West Virginia and western Maryland.
 WQED-HD
 WQED
 The Create Channel
 WQED: The Neighborhood Channel
 Classical WQED-FM 89.3/ Pittsburgh
 WQEJ-FM 89.7/ Johnstown
 WQED Education Department
 WQED Interactive

Mister Rogers' Neighborhood 
Fred Rogers of Mister Rogers' Neighborhood hosted his namesake show, that was taped in at WQED in Pittsburgh, for over three decades on PBS, teaching lifelong lessons to children using storytelling and teaching them to use their imagination.
Fred McFeeley Rogers was born in Latrobe, Pennsylvania in 1928, Rogers was an ordained Presbyterian minister, songwriter and pianist.  After graduating from Rollins College in Florida in 1951, Rogers moved to New York City to pursue a career with NBC as a Floor Manager.  He then returned to Pittsburgh in 1953 and started his work with WQED.  Rogers created "The Children's Corner" for WQED, which then led to the development of a 15-min version of Mister Rogers' Neighborhood for television in Canada, but he soon returned to Pittsburgh.  In 1968, Mister Rogers' Television debuted on National Educational Television and ran until 2001
.  The program reached over 8 million households on over 300 PBS stations.  Roger's pioneering program was one of the first to encourage children's self-esteem, self-control, cooperation, ability to confront and deal with problems, appreciate diversity and other critical life values and behaviors.

In 1987, Rogers took a trip to the former Soviet Union to appear on a children's television program with Daniel Striped Tiger, one of Roger's most well-known puppets. Rogers has a star on the Hollywood Walk of Fame. Rogers won awards including a handful of Emmys and a Presidential Medal of Freedom in 2002.  He retired in 2001 and died in 2003.  Rogers was married to Joanna, with whom he had two sons, James and Joseph, and a grandson Alexander.

WQEX sale 

In 1996, WQED tried to sell another PBS affiliate in Pittsburgh, WQEX-TV (Channel 16).  The U.S. Federal Communications Commission denied WQED's request.  The network pleaded financial hardship, and eventually the sale was authorized. After the sale, WQEX-TV became WINP-TV.

Antenna tower 
WQED Multimedia's antenna tower is located in Pittsburgh's Oakland neighborhood, bordering  the University of Pittsburgh's upper campus (coordinates ). It supports not only WQED Multimedia's own full-power stations WQED (TV) (on VHF channel 13) and WQED-FM (89.3 MHz), but also full-power Ion Television station WINP-TV (on UHF channel 38), a broadcast translator of ABC affiliate WTAE-TV (on UHF channel 22), and most of Pittsburgh's low-power stations, including WEPA-CD, WPDN-LD, WOSC-CD, WNNB-CD, WIIC-LD, WBYD-CD and WPTG-CD (respectively on UHF channels 16, 24, 26, 30, 31, 39 and 49). The central location of the antenna tower facilitates antenna aiming, which is often critical especially for reception of low-power stations in Pittsburgh's hilly terrain.

The antenna tower has a distinctive "candelabrum" shape above the Oakland skyline, with the two "candles" supporting respectively the WQED (TV) and WINP-TV antennas, and the remaining antennas mounted lower on the structure.

Because of the FCC broadcast incentive auction, WEPA-CD and WNNB-CD closed on 10/25/2017; WINP-TV will move to WEPA-CD's UHF channel 16 and WBYD-CD to WNNB-CD's UHF channel 30 in Phase 4 of the spectrum repack (ending 8/2/2019). WQED (TV) will move to VHF channel 2 in Phase 9 of the repack (ending 5/1/2020).

References

More references
  
  "FCC Denies WQED's Plans to sell WQEX, Doug Halonen.  Electronic Media, July 29, 1996.
  
  "Fred McFeeley Rogers," Columbia Electronic Encyclopedia, 6th Edition.

Non-profit organizations based in Pittsburgh